Horsfordia is a small genus of flowering plants in the mallow family known commonly as velvetmallows. There are four species which are native to Mexico and the southwestern United States. These are hairy subshrubs which bear light pink, lavender, or red-orange flowers.

Species:
Horsfordia alata
Horsfordia exalata
Horsfordia newberryi
Horsfordia rotundifolia

External links
 Calflora Database: Horsfordia
Jepson Manual Treatment of Horsfordia
USDA Plants Profile for Horsfordia

Malveae
Flora of the California desert regions
Flora of the Sonoran Deserts
North American desert flora
Malvaceae genera